Koy is a given name and surname. Notable people with the name include:

Given name
Koy Banal,  Filipino basketball coach
Koy Detmer (born 1973), American football player

Surname
Ernie Koy (1909–2007), American baseball player
Ernie Koy Jr. (born 1942), American football player
Jo Koy (born 1971), American stand-up comic
Ted Koy  (born 1947), American football player

See also
Ah Koy, surname
Coy (name), given name and surname
, includes a list of people with the given name and surname Koi